The Al-Hannanah Mosque is a Shi'ite mosque in Iraq. This mosque is also called Masjid ar-Ra's (Mosque of the Head (of Husayn ibn Ali)), because according to a narration attributed to Ja'far al-Sadiq, the head of his ancestor Husayn was kept in its middle, when being brought to his ‘aduww (opponent) Ubayd Allah ibn Ziyad.

Specifications
Al-Hannanah Mosque is located in the metropolis of Kufa and Najaf, near the qabr (grave) of Kumayl ibn Ziyad. According to Shaykh Al-Mufid, Sayyed Ibn Tawus and Shahid Awwal, when people arrived at Al-Hannanah Mosque, they should recite two unit prayers.

History
Jaafar Mahbouba believes that this mosque was built along with Imam Ali Mosque. Al-Buraqi believed that this mosque was built by order of Abbas I of Persia, and that because of this, he was known amongst the people of Najaf. According to Mohammad Hirz Eddin and Mirza Hadi el-Khurasani, Ghazan ibn Hulagu Khan ordered the building of this mosque as the mosque of Husayn's head.

According to a narration of Ja'far al-Sadiq, after Ali ibn Abi Talib died, his sons Hasan and Husayn carried his body from Kufa to Najaf. As they were passing, the pillars of the mosque inclined towards the body. 

The name Al-Hannanah means "to cry twice." This refers to two events. First, when Ali Ibn Abi Talib's burial shroud was brought to the Mosque, and then when the head of his son, Husayn, was brought through the Mosque.

Gallery

See also

 Holiest sites in Shia Islam
 Lists of mosques
 List of mosques in Iraq
 Mesopotamia in the Quran

References

Mosques in Iraq
Shia mosques in Iraq